Mihaela Buzărnescu and Alena Fomina were the defending champions, but Buzărnescu chose not participate. 

Fomina played alongside Valentina Ivakhnenko and successfully defended her title, defeating Réka Luca Jani and Cornelia Lister in the final, 7–5, 6–2.

Seeds

Draw

Draw

References
Main Draw

Al Habtoor Tennis Challenge - Doubles
2018 in Emirati tennis
Al Habtoor Tennis Challenge